Scirè (S 527) is a Todaro-class submarine of the Italian Navy. The submarine was laid down on 27 July 2000 at the Muggiano shipyard by Fincantieri. Scirè was launched on 18 December 2004 and commissioned on 19 February 2007.

Namesake 
Scirès earlier namesake, the submarine Scirè, was launched in 1938 and served during the Second World War. She participated in some of the operations of the Decima Flottiglia MAS, including the raid on Alexandria in 1941 using human torpedoes, before her loss in 1942.

Service

Scirè spent over five months deployed to the U.S. in 2009, participating in the CONUS 2009 exercise with the United States Navy.

References

External links

Scirè (S 527) Marina Militare website

2004 ships
Ships built by Fincantieri
Type 212 submarines of the Italian Navy
Submarines of Italy
Ships built in La Spezia